Son del Corazón is the first album released by Mexican singer Pilar Montenegro. It was released November 13, 1996.

This album yielded two singles: "De Amarte" and "Eres Todo Para Mí", which is a Spanish version of a Neil Sedaka single titled "You Mean Everything To Me".

Track listing
All tracks written by Fernando Riba and Kiko Campos, except where noted.
Tira, Tira — 4:00
De Amarte — 2:23
Muéveme — 4:30
Eres Todo Para Mí (Neil Sedaka) — 3:29
Sé Sincero — 4:00
Son del Corazón — 3:55
Duende — 3:26
La Bruja — 3:23
Cuando Quieras — 3:40
Deshójame — 3:38
Eres Todo Para Mí [Spanglish] — 3:29
De Amarte [Club Mix] — 4:42

References

1996 albums
Pilar Montenegro albums